The sooty myzomela (Myzomela tristrami) is a species of bird in the family Meliphagidae.
It is endemic to Makira.

References

sooty myzomela
Birds of Makira
Endemic fauna of the Solomon Islands
sooty myzomela
Taxonomy articles created by Polbot
Endemic birds of the Solomon Islands